The Youth Parliament (Voulí ton Efívon, literally "Parliament of the Youth") is a Youth Parliament organization established in 1994 and hosted annually by the Hellenic Parliament. 300 Lyceum Students from around the country are elected to represent their electorate districts by serving for one year as Young Members of the Parliament.

The aim of the institution is the active participation of young Greeks in the political life of the country and the encouragement to become active and responsible citizens.

Structure
The parliament's main organ in the plenary, which is made up of all delegates. Students also form 5 parliamentary committees each one addressing different issues related to school life and young adult life such as the Democratic Procedures Committee, the Education Committee and the Art and Science Committee. 

At the end of the Session each Committee chooses a Representative for representation in the General Assembly of the Youth Parliament which many Politicians attend.

In the 2019 and 2020 session, only domestic communities received representation in the parliament sessions.

See also

 European Youth Parliament
 Hellenic Parliament
 Model United Nations

References

Hellenic Parliament
Greece
Youth model government
Parliament